Spring is a small river of Thuringia, Germany. It flows into the river Milz in the village Milz.

See also
List of rivers of Thuringia

Rivers of Thuringia
Rivers of Germany